The Croatian Republican Party (HRS) is a Croat conservative, centre-right political party in Bosnia and Herzegovina. The party also participates in 11th electoral district for Croatian parliament.

History
The HRS was founded on 11 May 2014 by HDZ 1990 dissidents led by Slaven Raguž. At the founding assembly held at the Croatian Lodge "Herceg Stjepan Kosača", Slaven Raguž, who had recently left the HDZ 1990 as president of the Mostar City Committee and a member of the party's Central Committee, was elected acting president of the HRS. In 1990, several former HDZ officials, activists and young Croat intellectuals in BiH founded a new political party aimed at being an alternative to the ruling parties and fighting harder to establish a majority Croat federal unit within BiH. Former member of the HDZ 1990 Presidency, Slaven Bevanda, then Ivica Barabarić, Ivica Pušić and Dalibor Ravić were also elected to the interim presidency, which will lead the party until the convention. According to Raguž, HRS aims to be a political alternative at lower levels, but will be open to co-operation with parties seeking to improve the position of Croats in BiH: "The primary focus is on resolving the constitutional and legal status of Croats in BiH, BiH regulated on consociational and federalist principles, for BiH tailored to all three of its constituent peoples and all its citizens, where the Croatian issue would be resolved through an administrative territorial unit with a relative Croat majority".

In the 2022 Federation of Bosnia and Herzegovina general election, the party won a total of six seats in the Assemblies of the cantons of the Federation of Bosnia and Herzegovina and Raguž won a seat in the House of Representatives in the 9th Electoral Unit

Elections

Parliamentary Assembly of Bosnia and Herzegovina

Parliament of the Federation of Bosnia and Herzegovina

Cantonal assembly elections

Parliament of Croatia

References

Croat political parties in Bosnia and Herzegovina
Christian democratic parties in Europe
Conservative parties in Bosnia and Herzegovina
Catholic political parties
Political parties established in 2014
2014 establishments in Bosnia and Herzegovina